Cuffe Street (Irish: Sráid Mac Dhuibh or Sráid Cuffe) is a street in Dublin, Ireland which runs from St Stephen's Green at the Eastern end to Kevin Street Lower at the Western end.

History
Cuffe Street was named after James Cuffe MP, and first appears on maps in 1728. On John Rocque's map of Dublin in 1756 it is Great Cuffe Street. The residential buildings built in the early 1700s were mostly gable-fronted houses, so-called 'Dutch Billys', which were largely modified in the later Georgian and Victorian periods. Many of these buildings were demolished when Cuffe Street was significantly widened in the 1980s to create a dual carriageway.

Bricklayers' Hall

49 Cuffe Street for a period housed the headquarters of the Bricklayers' and Stonecutters' Guild. The building was originally constructed as the St Peter's Parish Savings Bank until its failure in the 1840s but the narrow building was later widened with an extra bay and separate door. It was demolished as part of the Dublin Corporation road widening scheme in 1985 which resulted in a settlement of £87,857. An ensuing legal action resulted in a court case and it was ultimately decided that the façade of the building would be saved and rebuilt along the new street line, with the money paid from the Corporation increasing to £244,414 for the strip of land they needed for the newly widened road. The façade was never reassembled, and Dublin City Council pursued reimbursement in 1996 with a repayment of £159,000 ultimately ordered by the High Court.

As of 2021, the numbered remaining elements of the Bricklayers' Hall are said to be held in storage by Dublin City Council.

Winter Garden Palace
The corner of Cuffe Street and St Stephen's Green was the site of the Winter Garden Palace for over 200 years. From early reports in 1866, it was referred to as the Winter Garden Gin Palace. During the 1880s, it was a meeting place of the Fenian group, the Invincibles. It was also one of the sites occupied by the Irish Volunteers and Irish Citizen Army during the events of the Easter Rising in 1916. The building was subject to the compulsory purchase order in 1966, for the planned road widening. It lay empty and derelict before it was finally demolished in 1975. Alongside the Winter Garden Palace, the residential and retail area bounded by Cuffe Street, Cuffe Lane and St Stephen's Green was bought up by developers MEPC plc and eventually demolished. MEPC built an office complex that was initially rented by the government Department of Posts and Telegraphs for Telecom Éireann.

Notable residents 

 James Bermingham - lived at 26 Cuffe Street
 Warden Flood
 Richard O'Carroll - lived at 49 Cuffe Street
 Eliza H. Trotter - lived at 30 Cuffe Street

See also
List of streets and squares in Dublin

External links

 Images of Cuffe Street over time from the RTE archives

References

Streets in Dublin (city)
St Stephen's Green